Danchev (feminine: Dancheva) is a Bulgarian-language surname literally meaning "son/daughter of Dancho", with the latter being a diminutive of Daniel. Notable people with this surname include:

Andrey Danchev
Ivaylo Danchev
Maria Dancheva
Vladimir Danchev 
Yordan Danchev

Bulgarian-language surnames
patronymic surnames